Curb or kerb, the raised edge of a raised footpath or roadway.

Curb or the Curb may also refer to:

Equestrian
 Curb (horse), an injury to the long plantar ligament in horses
 Curb bit, a type of bit used for riding horses
 Curb chain, a piece of horse tack used with a curb bit

Music
 Curb (album), Nickelback's first full-length album
 Mike Curb (born 1944), American musician
 Curb Records, a record label started by Mike Curb in 1973

Other uses
 The Curb, a nickname for the American Stock Exchange, from its original name The New York Curb Exchange
 The Curb (website), an Australian film website
 Curb Event Center, a multipurpose arena on the campus of Belmont University
 Curb Racing, a former NASCAR team
 Curbing, a form of assault
 Curb your dog, a NYC sign encouraging dog defecation in the curb rather than on the sidewalk

See also
Kerb (disambiguation)
 Curb Your Enthusiasm, HBO comedy show
 Curb trading, trading of securities outside the mainstream stock exchange